The Minnesota Duluth Bulldogs represented the University of Minnesota Duluth in WCHA women's ice hockey during the 2014–15 NCAA Division I women's ice hockey season. The Bulldogs were not able to win the NCAA tournament for the sixth time in school history. Of note, it represented the final season in which Shannon Miller served as head coach.

Offseason
July 10: The UMD Bulldogs announced that two-time Winter Games gold medalist Gina Kingsbury shall join Shannon Miller’s coaching staff. Previously, Kingsbury served on the coaching staff at Okanagan Hockey Academy.

Recruiting

2014–15 Bulldogs

Schedule

|-
!colspan=12 style=""| Regular Season

|-
!colspan=12 style=""| WCHA Tournament

Awards and honors
Ashleigh BrykaliukWCHA Offensive Player of the Week (Week of November 4, 2014) 

Brigette LacquetteDefenseAll-WCHA Second Team 

Zoe HickelDefenseAll-WCHA Second Team

References

Minnesota-Duluth
Minnesota Duluth Bulldogs women's ice hockey seasons